Sunday is a 1997 independent film directed by Jonathan Nossiter. Set in Queens, a borough of New York City, it is a dark comedy about an unemployed, homeless IBM functionary mistaken by an aging actress for film director Matthew Delacorta. The screenplay is an adaptation by Nossiter and James Lasdun of Lasdun's own short story "Ate, Memos or the Miracle" (published in his collection of stories, Three Evenings). The two would later collaborate again on Signs & Wonders.

Starring David Suchet (who reportedly added 40 pounds for his role), as well as Lisa Harrow and Jared Harris, it was shot on location in Queens and in an active homeless shelter, blending actors and non-actors.

Cast
 Arnold Barkus—Andy
 Jared Harris—Ray
 Bahman Soltani—Abram
 Willis Burks II—Selwyn (as Willis Burks)
 Joseph Sirola—Joe Subalowsky (as Joe Sirola)
 Henry Hayward—Sam
 Kevin Thigpen—David
 Chen Tsun Kit—Himself
 Lisa Harrow—Madeleine Vesey
 Larry Pine—Ben Vesey
 Yeon Joo Kim—Suky Vesey
 Fran Capo—Judy, Madeleine's Friend
 Spencer Paterson—Johnny O
 Joe Grifasi—Scottie Elster
 Jimmy Broadway—himself
 David Suchet—Oliver/Matthew Delacorta

Awards
The film won the 1997 Sundance Film Festival Grand Jury prize for Best Film and Best Screenplay. It also won the Deauville Film Festival Grand Prize for Best Film and its International Critics' prize. It marked Nossiter's debut at Cannes in the "Un Certain Regard" section (his 2004 Mondovino was in competition for the Palme d'Or) and was also included in The Museum of Modern Art's New Directors/New Films Festival.

References

External links
 

1997 films
1997 drama films
Films based on short fiction
Films directed by Jonathan Nossiter
American independent films
Films set in Queens, New York
American drama films
1997 independent films
1990s English-language films
1990s American films